Crassispira carbonaria is a species of sea snail, a marine gastropod mollusk in the family Pseudomelatomidae.

Description
The length of the shell varies between 18 mm and 35 mm.

The shell is very solid, with a well-defined shoulder, and sulcate space above it.  The longitudinal ribs are low, rounded, closer than in Crassispira bottae. The interspaces are very narrow, crossed by raised revolving lines. The shell is chocolate-colored.

Distribution
This marine species occurs off Western Africa, Gabon, Senegal and Guinea Bissau

References

 Reeve, Lovell. Conchologia Iconica: Or, Illustrations of the Shells of Molluscous Animals: I. Reeve, 1843.
 Gofas, S.; Afonso, J.P.; Brandào, M. (Ed.). (S.a.). Conchas e Moluscos de Angola = Coquillages et Mollusques d'Angola. [Shells and molluscs of Angola]. Universidade Agostinho / Elf Aquitaine Angola: Angola. 140 pp
 Bernard, P.A. (Ed.) (1984). Coquillages du Gabon [Shells of Gabon]. Pierre A. Bernard: Libreville, Gabon. 140, 75 plates pp.
 Nolf, F., 2009. Crassispira pseudocarbonaria: a new turrid from the Gulf of Guinea. Neptunea 8(1): 1-18

External links
 Rochebrune, A.-T. de. (1883). Diagnoses de mollusques nouveaux propres à la Sénégambie. Bulletin de la Société Philomathique de Paris. (7) /: 177-182
 Lamy, E. (1911). Sur quelques mollusques de Sénégambie. Bulletin du Muséum National d’Histoire Naturelle. 17: 316-319
 
 MNHN, Paris: holotype
 

carbonaria
Gastropods described in 1843